Johan Kely Viola Sánchez (born 21 October 1981 in San Juan de la Maguana) is a footballer from the Dominican Republic, who currently plays for FC Cadenazzo.

Career 
He previously played for FC Chiasso (2003-2004), AC Lugano (2004-2006), FC Winterthur (2006–08) in the Swiss Challenge League, GC Biaschesi at Swiss 1. Liga and FC Fribourg.

International
Viola made an appearance for the Dominican Republic national football team in a qualifying match for the 2010 FIFA World Cup.

Personal life 
He also holds an Italian passport.

References

1981 births
Living people
Dominican Republic footballers
Dominican Republic international footballers
Association football forwards
FC Chiasso players
FC Lugano players
FC Winterthur players
Expatriate footballers in Switzerland
Place of birth missing (living people)
FC Fribourg players